Shlomo Zalman Dolinsky (1871 – 1911), sometimes known as Rabbi Zalman Radiner, was an Orthodox Jewish rabbi in Lithuania and White Russia. He served as the mashgiach ruchani of the Mir Yeshiva in Belarus.

Biography 
Shlomo Zalman Dolinsky was born in 1871 in Alytus, Lithuania, then part of the Russian Empire. His parents were Rabbi Zecharia Mendel and Chana Chaya Katz (née Shafer). When he was a child, his family moved to Radun where his father became the community's rabbi, and thus he was later called "Reb Zalman Dolinsky." He studied in the Talmud Torah of Kelm, and in 1896, he married Rachel Boner; they eventually settled in Shavel. About 1900, Dolinsky was appointed mashgiach ruchani in the Slabodka Yeshiva under Rabbi Nosson Tzvi Finkel.

About 1907, Dolinksy became mashgiach at the Mir Yeshiva, under Elya Baruch Kammai and Eliezer Yehudah Finkel, however he soon got sick with stomach cancer and he had to go to Germany for treatments. After three years, he died on Tisha B'Av of 1911.

See also 
List of yeshivos in Europe (before World War II)
Rabbi Eliezer Yehuda Finkel (b. 1879)

References 

1871 births
1911 deaths
20th-century Russian rabbis
Haredi rabbis in Europe
Mashgiach ruchani
Lithuanian Haredi rabbis
Academic staff of Slabodka yeshiva
Mir mashgiach ruchanis
People from Alytus